Syzygium zeylanicum, the spicate eugenia, is a species of flowering plant in the family Myrtaceae. It is widely distributed, from Madagascar and India to China, Southeast Asia, and Malesia. A shrubby tree typically reaching , it prefers coastal secondary forests, forest edges, and riverbanks.

References

zeylanicum
Flora of Madagascar
Flora of India (region)
Flora of Bangladesh
Flora of Sri Lanka
Flora of the Andaman Islands
Flora of Indo-China
Flora of Southeast China
Flora of Malesia
Plants described in 1828